This article displays the qualifying draw of the 2011 Open GDF Suez.

Players

Seeds

Qualifiers

Lucky losers
  Stéphanie Cohen-Aloro

Qualifying draw

First qualifier

Second qualifier

Third qualifier

Fourth qualifier

References
 Qualifying Draw

Open GDF Suez